"Flirt!" is a song and single written by Jonathan King, Michel Delpech and Roland Vincent and performed by King. Released in 1972 it reached 22, on the UK charts, staying there for nine weeks. The song is a cover of a French song, Pour un Flirt, by Delpech and Vincent, to which King added English lyrics.

References 

1972 songs
1972 singles
Jonathan King songs
Decca Records singles
Songs written by Jonathan King
Song recordings produced by Jonathan King
Songs written by Michel Delpech